William George Icke (11 January 1921 – 14 March 2014) was an Australian rules footballer who played with South Melbourne and Geelong in the Victorian Football League (VFL).

Notes

External links 

1921 births
2014 deaths
Australian rules footballers from Victoria (Australia)
Sydney Swans players
Geelong Football Club players